Tamron Co., Ltd. is a Japanese company manufacturing photographic lenses, optical components and commercial/industrial-use optics.

Tamron is also a given name. It may refer to:

Tamron Hall (born 1970), American broadcast journalist and television talk show host
The Tamrons, American garage rock band in the 1960s